Haniska may refer to several places in Slovakia:

Haniska, Košice-okolie District,  a village and municipality
Haniska, Prešov District, a village and municipality